Televisión Nacional de Chile (TVN) is a Chilean state-owned national television network founded on October 24, 1969. Villa Los Aromos was the first telenovela produced by the network.

1980s

1981 
Villa Los Aromos

1982 
De cara al mañana
La gran mentira

1983 
El Juego de la vida

1984 
La represa
La torre 10

1985 
Morir de amor

1986 
La dama del balcón
La villa

1987 
Mi nombre es Lara

1988 
Bellas y audaces
Las dos caras del amor

1989 
A la sombra del ángel

1990s

1990 
El milagro de vivir

1991 
Volver a empezar

1992 
Trampas y caretas

1993 
Jaque Mate
Ámame

1994 
Rompecorazón
Rojo y miel

1995 
Estúpido Cupido
Juegos de fuego

1996 
Sucupira
Loca piel

1997 
Oro verde
Tic Tac

1998 
Iorana
Borrón y cuenta nueva

1999 
La fiera
Aquelarre

2000s

2000 
 Romané
 Santo ladrón

2001 
 Pampa Ilusión
 Amores de mercado

2002 
 El circo de las Montini
 Purasangre

2003 
 Puertas adentro
 16
 Pecadores

2004 
 Los Pincheira
 Destinos cruzados
 Ídolos

2005 
 17
 Los Capo
 Los treinta
 Versus

2006 
 Amor en tiempo récord
 Entre medias
 Cómplices
 Disparejas
 Floribella

2007 
 Corazón de María
 Alguien Te Mira
 Amor por accidente
 Karkú

2008 
 Viuda Alegre
 El Señor de la Querencia
 Hijos del Monte

2009 
 Los exitosos Pells
 ¿Dónde está Elisa?
 Los Ángeles de Estela
 Conde Vrolok

2010s

2010

2011

2012

2013

2014

2015

2016

2017

2019

See also 
 Televisión Nacional de Chile
 List of Canal 13 telenovelas

References 

Televisión Nacional de Chile
 
Telenovelas of Television Nacional de Chile